Dinaciclib (SCH-727965) is an experimental drug that inhibits cyclin-dependent kinases (CDKs). It is being evaluated in clinical trials for various cancer indications.

Dinaciclib is being developed by Merck & Co. It was granted orphan drug status by the FDA in 2011.

Mechanisms of action 
 Cyclin-dependent kinase inhibitor dinaciclib interacts with the acetyl-lysine recognition site of bromodomains.
 Dinaciclib (SCH727665) inhibits the unfolded protein response (UPR) through a CDK1 and CDK5-dependent mechanism.

Anti-tumoral action 
 In melanoma
 The anti-melanoma activity of dinaciclib is dependent on p53 signaling.
 In chronic lymphocytic leukemia (CLL)
 Dinaciclib promotes apoptosis and abrogates microenvironmental cytokine protection in chronic lymphocytic leukemia cells.
 In pancreatic cancer
 Dinaciclib inhibits pancreatic cancer growth and progression in murine xenograft models.
 In osteosarcoma
 Dinacliclib induces the apoptosis of osteosarcoma cells.
 Apoptosis of osteosarcoma cultures can be induced by the combination of the cyclin-dependent kinase inhibitor SCH727965 and a heat shock protein 90 inhibitor.

Role in developing neurons 
In primary cultured neurons, dinaciclib regulates neurogenesis, where it reduces expression of upper layer marker Satb2, and induces CTIP2, expressed in neurons of deeper layers.

Clinical trials 
 Phase II
 Advanced breast cancer
 Non-small cell lung cancer (NSCLC)
 Multiple myeloma
 Advanced melanoma
 Phase III
 A comparison of dinaciclib and ofatumumab for treatment of CLL

References

External links 
 

Amine oxides
Experimental cancer drugs
Protein kinase inhibitors
Pyrazolopyrimidines